The 11th European Badminton Championships were held in Kristiansand, Norway, between 10  and 16 April 1988, and hosted by the European Badminton Union and the Norges Badminton Forbund.

Medalists

Results

Semi-finals

Finals

Medal account

References

External links 
Results at BE

European Badminton Championships
European Badminton Championships
B
B
Badminton tournaments in Norway
Sport in Kristiansand